Philippe Guertin (born January 18, 1991) is a Canadian long-distance open water swimmer.

In April 2017, Guertin was named to Canada's 2017 World Aquatics Championships team in Budapest, Hungary.

References

External links
 
 

1991 births
Living people
Canadian male freestyle swimmers
Canadian long-distance swimmers
Sportspeople from Saint John, New Brunswick
Competitors at the 2015 Summer Universiade